The 58th United States Congress was a meeting of the legislative branch of the United States federal government, composed of the United States Senate and the United States House of Representatives. It met in Washington, DC, from March 4, 1903, to March 4, 1905, during the third and fourth years of Theodore Roosevelt's presidency. The apportionment of seats in the House of Representatives was based on the 1900 United States census. Both chambers had a Republican majority.

Major events

Major legislation 

 April 28, 1904: Kinkaid Act
 February 1, 1905: Transfer Act of 1905

Party summary

Senate

House of Representatives

Leadership

Senate 
President: Vacant
President pro tempore: William P. Frye (R)
Republican Conference Chairman: William B. Allison 
Democratic Caucus Chairman: Arthur P. Gorman 
 Democratic Caucus Secretary: Edward W. Carmack

House of Representatives 
Speaker: Joseph G. Cannon (R)

Majority (Republican) leadership 
Majority Leader: Sereno E. Payne
Majority Whip: James A. Tawney
 Republican Conference Chair: William Peters Hepburn

Minority (Democratic) leadership 
Minority Leader: John Sharp Williams
Minority Whip: James T. Lloyd
 Democratic Caucus Chairman: James Hay
 Democratic Campaign Committee Chairman: James M. Griggs

Members 
This list is arranged by chamber, then by state. Senators are listed in order of seniority, and representatives are listed by district.

Skip to House of Representatives, below

Senate 
At this time, senators were elected by the state legislatures every two years, with one-third beginning new six-year terms with each Congress. Preceding the names in the list below are Senate class numbers, which indicate the cycle of their election, In this Congress, Class 1 meant their term ended with this Congress, facing re-election in 1904; Class 2 meant their term began in the last Congress, facing re-election in 1906; and Class 3 meant their term began in this Congress, facing re-election in 1908.

Alabama 
 2. John T. Morgan (D)
 3. Edmund W. Pettus (D)

Arkansas 
 2. James H. Berry (D)
 3. James P. Clarke (D)

California 
 1. Thomas R. Bard (R)
 3. George C. Perkins (R)

Colorado 
 2. Thomas M. Patterson (D)
 3. Henry M. Teller (D)

Connecticut 
 1. Joseph R. Hawley (R)
 3. Orville H. Platt (R)

Delaware 
 1. L. Heisler Ball (R)
 2. J. Frank Allee (R)

Florida 
 2. James P. Taliaferro (D)
 3. Stephen Mallory (D)

Georgia 
 2. Augustus O. Bacon (D)
 3. Alexander S. Clay (D)

Idaho 
 2. Fred T. Dubois (D)
 3. Weldon B. Heyburn (R)

Illinois 
 2. Shelby M. Cullom (R)
 3. Albert J. Hopkins (R)

Indiana 
 1. Albert J. Beveridge (R)
 3. Charles W. Fairbanks (R), until March 3, 1905

Iowa 
 2. Jonathan P. Dolliver (R)
 3. William B. Allison (R)

Kansas 
 2. Joseph R. Burton (R)
 3. Chester I. Long (R)

Kentucky 
 2. Joseph C. S. Blackburn (D)
 3. James B. McCreary (D)

Louisiana 
 2. Murphy J. Foster (D)
 3. Samuel D. McEnery (D)

Maine 
 1. Eugene Hale (R)
 2. William P. Frye (R)

Maryland 
 1. Louis E. McComas (R)
 3. Arthur P. Gorman (D)

Massachusetts 
 1. Henry Cabot Lodge (R)
 2. George F. Hoar (R), until September 30, 1904
 Winthrop M. Crane (R), from October 12, 1904

Michigan 
 1. Julius C. Burrows (R)
 2. Russell A. Alger (R)

Minnesota 
 1. Moses E. Clapp (R)
 2. Knute Nelson (R)

Mississippi 
 1. Hernando D. Money (D)
 2. Anselm J. McLaurin (D)

Missouri 
 1. Francis M. Cockrell (D)
 3. William J. Stone (D)

Montana 
 1. Paris Gibson (D)
 2. William A. Clark (D)

Nebraska 
 1. Charles H. Dietrich (R)
 2. Joseph H. Millard (R)

Nevada 
 1. William M. Stewart (R)
 3. Francis G. Newlands (D)

New Hampshire 
 2. Henry E. Burnham (R)
 3. Jacob H. Gallinger (R)

New Jersey 
 1. John Kean (R)
 2. John F. Dryden (R)

New York 
 1. Chauncey M. Depew (R)
 3. Thomas C. Platt (R)

North Carolina 
 2. Furnifold M. Simmons (D)
 3. Lee S. Overman (D)

North Dakota 
 1. Porter J. McCumber (R)
 3. Henry C. Hansbrough (R)

Ohio 
 1. Marcus A. Hanna (R), until February 15, 1904
 Charles W. F. Dick (R), from March 2, 1904
 3. Joseph B. Foraker (R)

Oregon 
 2. John H. Mitchell (R)
 3. Charles W. Fulton (R)

Pennsylvania 
 1. Matthew S. Quay (R), until May 28, 1904
 Philander C. Knox (R), from June 10, 1904
 3. Boies Penrose (R)

Rhode Island 
 1. Nelson W. Aldrich (R)
 2. George P. Wetmore (R)

South Carolina 
 2. Benjamin R. Tillman (D)
 3. Asbury C. Latimer (D)

South Dakota 
 2. Robert J. Gamble (R)
 3. Alfred B. Kittredge (R)

Tennessee 
 1. William B. Bate (D)
 2. Edward W. Carmack (D)

Texas 
 1. Charles A. Culberson (D)
 2. Joseph W. Bailey (D)

Utah 
 1. Thomas Kearns (R)
 3. Reed Smoot (R)

Vermont 
 1. Redfield Proctor (R)
 3. William P. Dillingham (R)

Virginia 
 1. John W. Daniel (D)
 2. Thomas S. Martin (D)

Washington 
 1. Addison G. Foster (R)
 3. Levi Ankeny (R)

West Virginia 
 1. Nathan B. Scott (R)
 2. Stephen B. Elkins (R)

Wisconsin 
 1. Joseph V. Quarles (R)
 3. John C. Spooner (R)

Wyoming 
 1. Clarence D. Clark (R)
 2. Francis E. Warren (R)

House of Representatives 
The names of members of the House of Representatives elected statewide on the general ticket or otherwise at-large, are preceded by an "At-large," and the names of those elected from districts, whether plural or single member, are preceded by their district numbers.

Many of the congressional district numbers are linked to articles describing the district itself. Since the boundaries of the districts have changed often and substantially, the linked article may only describe the district as it exists today, and not as it was at the time of this Congress.

Alabama 
 . George W. Taylor (D)
 . Ariosto A. Wiley (D)
 . Henry D. Clayton (D)
 . Sydney J. Bowie (D)
 . Charles Winston Thompson (D), until March 20, 1904
 J. Thomas Heflin (D), from May 19, 1904
 . John H. Bankhead (D)
 . John L. Burnett (D)
 . William N. Richardson (D)
 . Oscar Underwood (D)

Arkansas 
 . Robert B. Macon (D)
 . Stephen Brundidge Jr. (D)
 . Hugh A. Dinsmore (D)
 . John S. Little (D)
 . Charles C. Reid (D)
 . Joseph Taylor Robinson (D)
 . Robert M. Wallace (D)

California 
 . James N. Gillett (R)
 . Theodore A. Bell (D)
 . Victor H. Metcalf (R), until July 1, 1904
 Joseph R. Knowland (R), from November 8, 1904
 . Edward J. Livernash (D)
 . William J. Wynn (D)
 . James C. Needham (R)
 . James McLachlan (R)
 . Milton J. Daniels (R)

Colorado 
 . John F. Shafroth (D), until February 15, 1904
 Robert W. Bonynge (R), from February 16, 1904
 . Herschel M. Hogg (R)
 . Franklin E. Brooks (R)

Connecticut 
 . E. Stevens Henry (R)
 . Nehemiah D. Sperry (R)
 . Frank B. Brandegee (R)
 . Ebenezer J. Hill (R)
 . George L. Lilley (R)

Delaware 
 . Henry A. Houston (D)

Florida 
 . Stephen M. Sparkman (D)
 . Robert W. Davis (D)
 . William B. Lamar (D)

Georgia 
 . Rufus E. Lester (D)
 . James M. Griggs (D)
 . Elijah B. Lewis (D)
 . William C. Adamson (D)
 . Leonidas F. Livingston (D)
 . Charles L. Bartlett (D)
 . John W. Maddox (D)
 . William M. Howard (D)
 . Farish C. Tate (D)
 . Thomas W. Hardwick (D)
 . William G. Brantley (D)

Idaho 
 . Burton L. French (R)

Illinois 
 . Martin Emerich (D)
 . James R. Mann (R)
 . William W. Wilson (R)
 . George P. Foster (D)
 . James McAndrews (D)
 . William Lorimer (R)
 . Philip Knopf (R)
 . William Frank Mahoney (D), until December 27, 1904
 . Henry S. Boutell (R)
 . George E. Foss (R)
 . Howard M. Snapp (R)
 . Charles Eugene Fuller (R)
 . Robert R. Hitt (R)
 . Benjamin F. Marsh (R)
 . George W. Prince (R)
 . Joseph V. Graff (R)
 . John A. Sterling (R)
 . Joseph G. Cannon (R)
 . Vespasian Warner (R)
 . Henry T. Rainey (D)
 . Ben F. Caldwell (D)
 . William A. Rodenberg (R)
 . Joseph B. Crowley (D)
 . James R. Williams (D)
 . George Washington Smith (R)

Indiana 
 . James A. Hemenway (R)
 . Robert W. Miers (D)
 . William T. Zenor (D)
 . Francis M. Griffith (D)
 . Elias S. Holliday (R)
 . James E. Watson (R)
 . Jesse Overstreet (R)
 . George W. Cromer (R)
 . Charles B. Landis (R)
 . Edgar D. Crumpacker (R)
 . Frederick Landis (R)
 . James M. Robinson (D)
 . Abraham L. Brick (R)

Iowa 
 . Thomas Hedge (R)
 . Martin Joseph Wade (D)
 . Benjamin P. Birdsall (R)
 . Gilbert N. Haugen (R)
 . Robert G. Cousins (R)
 . John F. Lacey (R)
 . John A. T. Hull (R)
 . William P. Hepburn (R)
 . Walter I. Smith (R)
 . James P. Conner (R)
 . Lot Thomas (R)

Kansas 
 . Charles Curtis (R)
 . Justin De Witt Bowersock (R)
 . Philip P. Campbell (R)
 . James Monroe Miller (R)
 . William A. Calderhead (R)
 . William A. Reeder (R)
 . Victor Murdock (R), from May 26, 1903
 . Charles Frederick Scott (R)

Kentucky 
 . Ollie M. James (D)
 . Augustus Stanley (D)
 . John S. Rhea (D)
 . David Highbaugh Smith (D)
 . J. Swagar Sherley (D)
 . Daniel Linn Gooch (D)
 . South Trimble (D)
 . George G. Gilbert (D)
 . James Nicholas Kehoe (D)
 . Francis A. Hopkins (D)
 . Vincent Boreing (R), until September 16, 1903
 W. Godfrey Hunter (R), from November 10, 1903

Louisiana 
 . Adolph Meyer (D)
 . Robert C. Davey (D)
 . Robert F. Broussard (D)
 . Phanor Breazeale (D)
 . Joseph E. Ransdell (D)
 . Samuel M. Robertson (D)
 . Arsène Paulin Pujó (D)

Maine 
 . Amos L. Allen (R)
 . Charles E. Littlefield (R)
 . Edwin C. Burleigh (R)
 . Llewellyn Powers (R)

Maryland 
 . William Humphreys Jackson (R)
 . J. Frederick C. Talbott (D)
 . Frank C. Wachter (R)
 . James W. Denny (D)
 . Sydney Emanuel Mudd I (R)
 . George A. Pearre (R)

Massachusetts 
 . George P. Lawrence (R)
 . Frederick H. Gillett (R)
 . John R. Thayer (D)
 . Charles Q. Tirrell (R)
 . Butler Ames (R)
 . Augustus P. Gardner (R)
 . Ernest W. Roberts (R)
 . Samuel W. McCall (R)
 . John A. Keliher (D)
 . William S. McNary (D)
 . John Andrew Sullivan (D)
 . Samuel L. Powers (R)
 . William S. Greene (R)
 . William C. Lovering (R)

Michigan 
 . Alfred Lucking (D)
 . Charles E. Townsend (R)
 . Washington Gardner (R)
 . Edward L. Hamilton (R)
 . William Alden Smith (R)
 . Samuel W. Smith (R)
 . Henry McMorran (R)
 . Joseph W. Fordney (R)
 . Roswell P. Bishop (R)
 . George A. Loud (R)
 . Archibald B. Darragh (R)
 . H. Olin Young (R)

Minnesota 
 . James Albertus Tawney (R)
 . James T. McCleary (R)
 . Charles Russell Davis (R)
 . Frederick C. Stevens (R)
 . John Lind (D)
 . Clarence Buckman (R)
 . Andrew Volstead (R)
 . James Bede (R)
 . Halvor Steenerson (R)

Mississippi 
 . Ezekiel S. Candler Jr. (D)
 . Thomas Spight (D)
 . Benjamin G. Humphreys II (D)
 . Wilson S. Hill (D)
 . Adam M. Byrd (D)
 . Eaton J. Bowers (D)
 . Frank A. McLain (D)
 . John Sharp Williams (D)

Missouri 
 . James T. Lloyd (D)
 . William W. Rucker (D)
 . John Dougherty (D)
 . Charles F. Cochran (D)
 . William S. Cowherd (D)
 . David A. De Armond (D)
 . Courtney W. Hamlin (D)
 . Dorsey W. Shackleford (D)
 . James Beauchamp Clark (D)
 . Richard Bartholdt (R)
 . John T. Hunt (D)
 . James Joseph Butler (D)
 . Edward Robb (D)
 . William D. Vandiver (D)
 . Maecenas E. Benton (D)
 . J. Robert Lamar (D)

Montana 
 . Joseph M. Dixon (R)

Nebraska 
 . Elmer J. Burkett (R)
 . Gilbert M. Hitchcock (D)
 . John J. McCarthy (R)
 . Edmund H. Hinshaw (R)
 . George W. Norris (R)
 . Moses P. Kinkaid (R)

Nevada 
 . Clarence D. Van Duzer (D)

New Hampshire 
 . Cyrus A. Sulloway (R)
 . Frank Dunklee Currier (R)

New Jersey 
 . Henry C. Loudenslager (R)
 . John J. Gardner (R)
 . Benjamin F. Howell (R)
 . William M. Lanning (R), until June 6, 1904
 Ira W. Wood (R), from November 8, 1904
 . Charles N. Fowler (R)
 . William Hughes (D)
 . Richard Wayne Parker (R)
 . William H. Wiley (R)
 . Allan Benny (D)
 . Allan L. McDermott (D)

New York 
 . Townsend Scudder (D)
 . George H. Lindsay (D)
 . Charles T. Dunwell (R)
 . Frank E. Wilson (D)
 . Edward M. Bassett (D)
 . Robert Baker (D)
 . John J. Fitzgerald (D)
 . Timothy D. Sullivan (D)
 . Henry M. Goldfogle (D)
 . William Sulzer (D)
 . William Randolph Hearst (D)
 . George B. McClellan Jr. (D), until December 21, 1903
 W. Bourke Cockran (D), from February 23, 1904
 . Francis B. Harrison (D)
 . Ira E. Rider (D)
 . William H. Douglas (R)
 . Jacob Ruppert (D)
 . Francis E. Shober (D)
 . Joseph A. Goulden (D)
 . Norton P. Otis (R), until February 20, 1905
 . Thomas W. Bradley (R)
 . John H. Ketcham (R)
 . William H. Draper (R)
 . George N. Southwick (R)
 . George J. Smith (R)
 . Lucius N. Littauer (R)
 . William H. Flack (R)
 . James S. Sherman (R)
 . Charles L. Knapp (R)
 . Michael E. Driscoll (R)
 . John W. Dwight (R)
 . Sereno E. Payne (R)
 . James B. Perkins (R)
 . Charles W. Gillet (R)
 . James W. Wadsworth (R)
 . William H. Ryan (D)
 . De Alva S. Alexander (R)
 . Edward B. Vreeland (R)

North Carolina 
 . John Humphrey Small (D)
 . Claude Kitchin (D)
 . Charles R. Thomas (D)
 . Edward W. Pou (D)
 . William W. Kitchin (D)
 . Gilbert B. Patterson (D)
 . Robert N. Page (D)
 . Theodore F. Kluttz (D)
 . Edwin Y. Webb (D)
 . James M. Gudger Jr. (D)

North Dakota 
 . Thomas Frank Marshall (R)
 . Burleigh F. Spalding (R)

Ohio 
 . Nicholas Longworth (R)
 . Herman P. Goebel (R)
 . Robert M. Nevin (R)
 . Harvey C. Garber (D)
 . John S. Snook (D)
 . Charles Q. Hildebrant (R)
 . Thomas B. Kyle (R)
 . William R. Warnock (R)
 . James H. Southard (R)
 . Stephen Morgan (R)
 . Charles H. Grosvenor (R)
 . De Witt C. Badger (D)
 . Amos H. Jackson (R)
 . William W. Skiles (R), until January 9, 1904
 Amos R. Webber (R), from November 8, 1904
 . Henry C. Van Voorhis (R)
 . John J. Gill (R), until October 31, 1903
 Capell L. Weems (R), from November 3, 1903
 . John W. Cassingham (D)
 . James Kennedy (R)
 . Charles W. F. Dick (R), until March 23, 1904
 W. Aubrey Thomas (R), from November 8, 1904
 . Jacob A. Beidler (R)
 . Theodore E. Burton (R)

Oregon 
 . Binger Hermann (R), from June 1, 1903
 . John N. Williamson (R)

Pennsylvania 
 . Henry H. Bingham (R)
 . Robert Adams Jr. (R)
 . Henry Burk (R), until December 5, 1903
 George A. Castor (R), from February 16, 1904
 . Robert H. Foerderer (R), until July 26, 1903
 Reuben O. Moon (R), from November 3, 1903
 . Edward D. Morrell (R)
 . George D. McCreary (R)
 . Thomas S. Butler (R)
 . Irving P. Wanger (R)
 . Henry B. Cassel (R)
 . George Howell (D), until February 10, 1904
 William Connell (R), from February 10, 1904
 . Henry W. Palmer (R)
 . George R. Patterson (R)
 . Marcus C. L. Kline (D)
 . Charles F. Wright (R)
 . Elias Deemer (R)
 . Charles H. Dickerman (D)
 . Thaddeus M. Mahon (R)
 . Marlin E. Olmsted (R)
 . Alvin Evans (R)
 . Daniel F. Lafean (R)
 . Solomon R. Dresser (R)
 . George F. Huff (R)
 . Allen F. Cooper (R)
 . Ernest F. Acheson (R)
 . Arthur L. Bates (R)
 . Joseph H. Shull (D)
 . William O. Smith (R)
 . Joseph C. Sibley (R)
 . George Shiras III (R)
 . John Dalzell (R)
 . Henry K. Porter (R)
 . James W. Brown (R)

Rhode Island 
 . Daniel L. D. Granger (D)
 . Adin B. Capron (R)

South Carolina 
 . George S. Legare (D)
 . George W. Croft (D), until March 10, 1904
 Theodore G. Croft (D), from May 17, 1904
 . Wyatt Aiken (D)
 . Joseph T. Johnson (D)
 . David E. Finley (D)
 . Robert B. Scarborough (D)
 . Asbury F. Lever (D)

South Dakota 
 . Charles H. Burke (R)
 . Eben W. Martin (R)

Tennessee 
 . Walter P. Brownlow (R)
 . Henry R. Gibson (R)
 . John A. Moon (D)
 . Morgan Cassius Fitzpatrick (D)
 . James D. Richardson (D)
 . John W. Gaines (D)
 . Lemuel P. Padgett (D)
 . Thetus W. Sims (D)
 . Rice A. Pierce (D)
 . Malcolm R. Patterson (D)

Texas 
 . Morris Sheppard (D)
 . Samuel B. Cooper (D)
 . Gordon J. Russell (D)
 . Choice B. Randell (D)
 . James Andrew Beall (D)
 . Scott Field (D)
 . Alexander W. Gregg (D)
 . Thomas H. Ball (D), until November 16, 1903
 John M. Pinckney (D), from November 17, 1903
 . George Farmer Burgess (D)
 . Albert S. Burleson (D)
 . Robert L. Henry (D)
 . Oscar W. Gillespie (D)
 . John H. Stephens (D)
 . James L. Slayden (D)
 . John Nance Garner (D)
 . William R. Smith (D)

Utah 
 . Joseph Howell (R)

Vermont 
 . David J. Foster (R)
 . Kittredge Haskins (R)

Virginia 
 . William A. Jones (D)
 . Harry L. Maynard (D)
 . John Lamb (D)
 . Robert G. Southall (D)
 . Claude A. Swanson (D)
 . Carter Glass (D)
 . James Hay (D)
 . John F. Rixey (D)
 . Campbell Slemp (R)
 . Henry D. Flood (D)

Washington 
 . Wesley L. Jones (R)
 . Francis W. Cushman (R)
 . William E. Humphrey (R)

West Virginia 
 . Blackburn B. Dovener (R)
 . Alston G. Dayton (R)
 . Joseph Holt Gaines (R)
 . Harry C. Woodyard (R)
 . James Anthony Hughes (R)

Wisconsin 
 . Henry Allen Cooper (R)
 . Henry C. Adams (R)
 . Joseph W. Babcock (R)
 . Theobald Otjen (R)
 . William H. Stafford (R)
 . Charles H. Weisse (D)
 . John J. Esch (R)
 . James H. Davidson (R)
 . Edward S. Minor (R)
 . Webster E. Brown (R)
 . John J. Jenkins (R)

Wyoming 
 . Franklin W. Mondell (R)

Non-voting members 
 . John Frank Wilson (D)
 . Jonah Kunio Kalanianaole (R)
 . Bernard Shandon Rodey (R)
 . Bird Segle McGuire (R)
 . Federico Degetau (Resident Commissioner) (R)

Changes in membership
The count below reflects changes from the beginning of the first session of this Congress.

Senate
 Replacements: 3
 Democratic: no net change
 Republican: no net change
 Deaths: 3
 Resignations: 1
 Vacancy: 0
 Total seats with changes:  4

House of Representatives
 Replacements: 14
 Democratic: 2 seat loss
 Republican: 2 seat gain
 Deaths: 8
 Resignations: 7
 Contested elections: 1
 Total seats with changes: 18

Committees

Senate

 Additional Accommodations for the Library of Congress (Select) (Chairman: James H. Berry; Ranking Member: Shelby M. Cullom)
 Agriculture and Forestry (Chairman: Redfield Proctor; Ranking Member: William B. Bate)
 Appropriations (Chairman: William B. Allison; Ranking Member: Francis M. Cockrell)
 Audit and Control the Contingent Expenses of the Senate (Chairman: John Kean; Ranking Member: Hernando D. Money)
 Canadian Relations (Chairman: Charles W. Fulton; Ranking Member: Benjamin R. Tillman)
 Census (Chairman: Joseph V. Quarles; Ranking Member: Samuel D. McEnery)
 Civil Service and Retrenchment (Chairman: George C. Perkins; Ranking Member: William B. Bate)
 Claims (Chairman: Francis E. Warren; Ranking Member: Thomas S. Martin)
 Coast and Insular Survey (Chairman: Levi Ankeny; Ranking Member: John Tyler Morgan)
 Coast Defenses (Chairman: John H. Mitchell; Ranking Member: Charles A. Culberson)
 Commerce (Chairman: William P. Frye; Ranking Member: James H. Berry)
 Corporations Organized in the District of Columbia (Chairman: Thomas S. Martin; Ranking Member: Nelson W. Aldrich)
 Cuban Relations (Chairman: Orville H. Platt; Ranking Member: Henry M. Teller)
 Distributing Public Revenue Among the States (Select)
 District of Columbia (Chairman: Jacob H. Gallinger; Ranking Member: Nelson W. Aldrich)
 Education and Labor (Chairman: Louis E. McComas; Ranking Member: John W. Daniel)
 Engrossed Bills (Chairman: Francis M. Cockrell; Ranking Member: George F. Hoar)
 Enrolled Bills (Chairman: John F. Dryden; Ranking Member: Murphy J. Foster)
 Establish a University in the United States (Select) (Chairman: Chester I. Long; Ranking Member: Alexander S. Clay)
 Examination and Disposition of Documents (Select) (Chairman: Russell A. Alger; Ranking Member: N/A)
 Examine the Several Branches in the Civil Service (Chairman: Moses E. Clapp; Ranking Member: Charles A. Culberson)
 Expenditures in Executive Departments
 Finance (Chairman: Nelson W. Aldrich; Ranking Member: John W. Daniel)
 Fisheries (Chairman: Albert J. Hopkins; Ranking Member: Stephen R. Mallory)
 Five Civilized Tribes of Indians (Select) (Chairman: William B. Bate; Ranking Member: Charles H. Dietrich)
 Foreign Relations (Chairman: Shelby M. Cullom; Ranking Member: John Tyler Morgan)
 Forest Reservations and the Protection of Game (Chairman: Joseph R. Burton; Ranking Member: John T. Morgan)
 Geological Survey (Chairman: Addison G. Foster; Ranking Member: Hernando D. Money)
 Immigration (Chairman: William P. Dillingham; Ranking Member: Anselm J. McLaurin)
 Indian Affairs (Chairman: William M. Stewart; Ranking Member: John Tyler Morgan)
 Indian Depredations (Chairman: J. Frank Allee; Ranking Member: Augustus O. Bacon)
 Industrial Expositions (Chairman: Henry E. Burnham; Ranking Member: John W. Daniel)
 Investigate the Condition of the Potomac River Front at Washington (Select) (Chairman: Joseph H. Millard; Ranking Member: William B. Bate)
 Indian Territory (Select) 
 Interoceanic Canals (Chairman: Mark Hanna; Ranking Member: Edward W. Carmack)
 Interstate Commerce (Chairman: Stephen B. Elkins; Ranking Member: Benjamin R. Tillman)  
 Irrigation and Reclamation of Arid Lands (Chairman: Thomas R. Bard; Ranking Member: Josiah W. Bailey)
 Judiciary (Chairman: George F. Hoar; Ranking Member: Augustus O. Bacon) 
 Library (Chairman: George P. Wetmore; Ranking Member: William A. Clark)
 Manufactures (Chairman: Weldon B. Heyburn; Ranking Member: Alexander S. Clay)
 Military Affairs (Chairman: Joseph R. Hawley; Ranking Member: William B. Bate)
 Mines and Mining (Chairman: Nathan B. Scott; Ranking Member: Benjamin R. Tillman)
 Mississippi River and its Tributaries (Select) (Chairman: Knute Nelson; Ranking Member: William B. Bate)
 National Banks (Select) (Chairman: Thomas Kearns; Ranking Member: Samuel D. McEnery)
 Naval Affairs (Chairman: Eugene Hale; Ranking Member: Benjamin R. Tillman)
 Organization, Conduct and Expenditures of the Executive Departments (Chairman: Matthew S. Quay; Ranking Member: Anselm J. McLaurin) 
 Pacific Islands and Puerto Rico (Chairman: Joseph B. Foraker; Ranking Member: Francis M. Cockrell)
 Pacific Railroads (Chairman: Jonathan P. Dolliver; Ranking Member: John Tyler Morgan)
 Patents (Chairman: Alfred B. Kittredge; Ranking Member: Stephen R. Mallory)
 Pensions (Chairman: Porter J. McCumber; Ranking Member: James P. Taliaferro)
 Philippines (Chairman: Henry Cabot Lodge; Ranking Member: Charles A. Culberson)
 Post Office and Post Roads (Chairman: Boies Penrose; Ranking Member: Alexander S. Clay)
 Potomac River Front (Select) 
 Printing (Chairman: Thomas C. Platt; Ranking Member: Arthur P. Gorman)
 Private Land Claims (Chairman: Henry M. Teller; Ranking Member: Eugene Hale)
 Privileges and Elections (Chairman: Julius C. Burrows; Ranking Member: Edmund W. Pettus)
 Public Buildings and Grounds (Chairman: Charles W. Fairbanks; Ranking Member: Charles A. Culberson)
 Public Health and National Quarantine (Chairman: John Tyler Morgan; Ranking Member: John Coit Spooner)
 Public Lands (Chairman: Henry C. Hansbrough; Ranking Member: James H. Berry)
 Railroads (Chairman: Clarence D. Clark; Ranking Member: Augustus O. Bacon)
 Revision of the Laws (Chairman: Chauncey M. Depew; Ranking Member: John W. Daniel)
 Revolutionary Claims (Chairman: Benjamin R. Tillman; Ranking Member: Orville H. Platt)
 Rules (Chairman: John C. Spooner; Ranking Member: Henry M. Teller)
 Standards, Weights and Measures (Select) (Chairman: Reed Smoot)
 Tariff Regulation (Select)
 Territories (Chairman: Albert J. Beveridge; Ranking Member: William B. Bate)
 Transportation and Sale of Meat Products (Select) (Chairman: John W. Daniel; Ranking Member: Porter J. McCumber)
 Transportation Routes to the Seaboard (Chairman: Robert J. Gamble; Ranking Member: Edmund W. Pettus)
 Trespassers upon Indian Lands (Select) (Chairman: Charles H. Dietrich; Ranking Member: John Tyler Morgan)
 Ventilation and Acoustics (Select) (Chairman: L. Heisler Ball; Ranking Member: N/A)
 Whole
 Woman Suffrage (Select) (Chairman: Augustus O. Bacon; Ranking Member: Thomas R. Bard)

House of Representatives

 Accounts (Chairman: Charles Q. Hildebrant; Ranking Member: Charles Lafayette Bartlett)
 Agriculture (Chairman: James W. Wadsworth; Ranking Member: John Lamb)
 Alcoholic Liquor Traffic (Chairman: Nehemiah D. Sperry; Ranking Member: John L. Burnett)
 Appropriations (Chairman: James A. Hemenway; Ranking Member: Leonidas F. Livingston)
 Banking and Currency (Chairman: Charles N. Fowler; Ranking Member: John R. Thayer)  
 Census (Chairman: Edgar D. Crumpacker; Ranking Member: Francis M. Griffith)
 Claims (Chairman: Joseph V. Graff; Ranking Member: Henry M. Goldfogle)
 Coinage, Weights and Measures (Chairman: James H. Southard; Ranking Member: Charles F. Cochran)
 Disposition of Executive Papers
 District of Columbia (Chairman: Joseph W. Babcock; Ranking Member: Adolph Meyer)
 Education (Chairman: George N. Southwick; Ranking Member: Willard Vandiver)
 Election of the President, Vice President and Representatives in Congress (Chairman: Joseph H. Gaines; Ranking Member: William W. Rucker)
 Elections No.#1 (Chairman: James Robert Mann; Ranking Member: Ollie M. James)
 Elections No.#2 (Chairman: Marlin E. Olmsted; Ranking Member: Joshua Frederick Cockey Talbott)
 Elections No.#3 (Chairman: Michael E. Driscoll; Ranking Member: Frank A. McLain)
 Enrolled Bills (Chairman: Frank C. Wachter; Ranking Member: James T. Lloyd)
 Expenditures in the Agriculture Department (Chairman: Charles F. Wright; Ranking Member: Henry D. Flood)
 Expenditures in the Commerce and Labor Departments (Chairman: David J. Foster; Ranking Member: N/A)
 Expenditures in the Interior Department (Chairman: Edward S. Minor; Ranking Member: Ezekiel S. Candler Jr.)
 Expenditures in the Justice Department (Chairman: William A. Calderhead; Ranking Member: Henry M. Goldfogle)
 Expenditures in the Navy Department (Chairman: Joseph W. Fordney; Ranking Member: Charles W. Thompson)
 Expenditures in the Post Office Department (Chairman: Irving P. Wanger; Ranking Member: Edward Robb)
 Expenditures in the State Department (Chairman: John H. Ketcham; Ranking Member: Rufus E. Lester)
 Expenditures in the Treasury Department (Chairman: Robert G. Cousins; Ranking Member: John Lamb)
 Expenditures in the War Department (Chairman: William R. Warnock; Ranking Member: George F. Burgess)
 Expenditures on Public Buildings (Chairman: James A. Hughes; Ranking Member: John H. Small)
 Foreign Affairs (Chairman: Robert R. Hitt; Ranking Member: Hugh A. Dinsmore)
 Immigration and Naturalization (Chairman: Benjamin F. Howell; Ranking Member: Jacob Ruppert Jr.)
 Indian Affairs (Chairman: James S. Sherman; Ranking Member: John H. Stephens)
 Industrial Arts and Expositions (Chairman: James A. Tawney; Ranking Member: Charles Lafayette Bartlett)
 Insular Affairs (Chairman: Henry Allen Cooper; Ranking Member: William A. Jones)
 Interstate and Foreign Commerce (Chairman: William P. Hepburn; Ranking Member: Robert C. Davey)
 Invalid Pensions (Chairman: Cyrus A. Sulloway; Ranking Member: Robert W. Miers)
 Irrigation of Arid Lands (Chairman: Frank W. Mondell; Ranking Member: Oscar W. Underwood)
 Judiciary (Chairman: John J. Jenkins; Ranking Member: David A. De Armond) 
 Labor (Chairman: John J. Gardner; Ranking Member: Ben F. Caldwell)
 Levees and Improvements of the Mississippi River (Chairman: Richard Bartholdt; Ranking Member: Robert F. Broussard)
 Library (Chairman: James T. McCleary; Ranking Member: James D. Richardson)
 Manufactures (Chairman: Joseph C. Sibley; Ranking Member: Willard D. Vandiver)
 Merchant Marine and Fisheries (Chairman: Charles H. Grosvenor; Ranking Member: Thomas Spight)
 Mileage (Chairman: William A. Reeder; Ranking Member: Elijah B. Lewis)
 Military Affairs (Chairman: John A.T. Hull; Ranking Member: William Sulzer)
 Militia (Chairman: Charles Dick; Ranking Member: Joseph B. Crowley)
 Mines and Mining (Chairman: Webster E. Brown; Ranking Member: Farish Carter Tate)
 Naval Affairs (Chairman: George E. Foss; Ranking Member: Adolph Meyer)
 Pacific Railroads (Chairman: William A. Smith; Ranking Member: William J. Wynn)
 Patents (Chairman: Frank D. Currier; Ranking Member: William Sulzer)
 Pensions (Chairman: Henry C. Loudenslager; Ranking Member: William Richardson)
 Post Office and Post Roads (Chairman: Jesse Overstreet; Ranking Member: John A. Moon)
 Printing (Chairman: Charles B. Landis; Ranking Member: Farish Carter Tate)
 Private Land Claims (Chairman: George W. Smith; Ranking Member: William A. Jones)
 Public Buildings and Grounds (Chairman: Charles W. Gillet; Ranking Member: John H. Bankhead)
 Public Lands (Chairman: John F. Lacey; Ranking Member: John F. Shafroth)
 Railways and Canals (Chairman: James H. Davidson; Ranking Member: John L. Burnett)
 Reform in the Civil Service (Chairman: Frederick H. Gillett; Ranking Member: Edward W. Pou)
 Revision of Laws (Chairman: Vespasian Warner; Ranking Member: Daniel L.D. Granger)
 Rivers and Harbors (Chairman: Theodore E. Burton; Ranking Member: Rufus E. Lester)
 Rules (Chairman: John Dalzell; Ranking Member: John S. Williams) 
 Standards of Official Conduct
 Territories (Chairman: Edward L. Hamilton; Ranking Member: John A. Moon)
 Ventilation and Acoustics (Chairman: Roswell P. Bishop; Ranking Member: David H. Smith)
 War Claims (Chairman: Thaddeus M. Mahon; Ranking Member: Thetus W. Sims)
 Ways and Means (Chairman: Sereno E. Payne; Ranking Member: John S. Williams)
 Whole

Joint committees

 Conditions of Indian Tribes (Special)
 Disposition of (Useless) Executive Papers
 The Library
 Printing

Caucuses
 Democratic (House)
 Democratic (Senate)

Employees

Legislative branch agency directors
 Architect of the Capitol: Elliott Woods
 Librarian of Congress: Herbert Putnam 
 Public Printer of the United States: Francis W. Palmer

Senate 
 Secretary: Charles G. Bennett
 Sergeant at Arms: Daniel M. Ransdell
 Librarian: Cliff Warden
 Chaplain: William Henry Milburn, Universalist, until November 23, 1903
 F.J. Prettyman, Methodist, elected November 23, 1903
 Edward E. Hale, Unitarian, elected December 14, 1903

House of Representatives 
 Clerk: Alexander McDowell
 Sergeant at Arms: Henry Casson
 Doorkeeper: Frank B. Lyon
 Postmaster: Joseph C. McElroy
 Reading Clerks: E.L. Sampson (D) and Dennis E. Alward (R) 
 Clerk at the Speaker's Table: Asher C. Hinds
 Chaplain: Henry N. Couden, Universalist

See also 
 1902 United States elections (elections leading to this Congress)
 1902–03 United States Senate elections
 1902 United States House of Representatives elections
 1904 United States elections (elections during this Congress, leading to the next Congress)
 1904 United States presidential election
 1904–05 United States Senate elections
 1904 United States House of Representatives elections

References